Tricholoma roseoacerbum is an agaric fungus of the genus Tricholoma. The species was first described by Italian mycologist Alfredo Riva in 1979 as Tricholoma pseudoimbricatum var. roseobrunneum, but that name competed with an older homonym, William Murrill's 1913 Tricholoma roseobrunneum. Riva published the species with a new replacement name in 1984. T. roseoacerbum is found in Europe and northeastern North America. The specific epithet roseoacerbum alludes to the rosy colouration in its cap, and overall resemblance to T. acerbum. This species is probably conspecific with Tricholoma radotinense Pilát & Charvát (1959).

See also
List of North American Tricholoma
List of Tricholoma species

References

roseoacerbum
Fungi described in 1984
Fungi of Europe
Fungi of North America